Trevor Lawrence (born 1999) is an American football player.

Trevor Lawrence may also refer to:

 Trevor Lawrence (musician), American saxophonist and producer
 Sir Trevor Lawrence, 2nd Baronet (1831–1913), English horticulturalist, art collector and politician

See also
 Trevor Laurence (1952–2015), New Zealand field hockey player